Maria Margareta Blom, (born 28 February 1971) is a Swedish film director, dramatist and screenwriter. She is perhaps best known for the film Masjävlar from 2004. Blom has written and directed more than ten theater plays among them "Rabarbers", "Sårskorpor" and " Dr. Kokos Kärlekslaboratorium" at Stockholms Stadsteater and "Under hallonbusken" at Dramaten.

Filmography
Masjävlar in 2017
Fishy in 2016
Nina Frisk in 2014
Hallåhallå in 2007
Bamse och häxans dotter in 2007
Monky in 2004

References

External links

Living people
1971 births
Swedish film directors
Swedish women film directors